Ten Tonnes is the debut studio album by British singer/songwriter Ten Tonnes. It was released on 3 May 2019 via Warner Records.

Track listing
Credits adapted from Tidal.

Charts

References

2019 debut albums
Ten Tonnes albums
Warner Records albums